"Rockin' Back Inside My Heart" is a song by Julee Cruise, released as the second single from her 1989 debut album Floating into the Night. It was released on Warner Bros. Records.

Content 
The song is in the dream pop genre, with jazzy flourishes. Angelo Badalamenti composed the music and David Lynch wrote the lyrics.

Use in media 
Cruise performs the song in "Episode 14" of Twin Peaks, the long-anticipated episode of the show in which the killer of Laura Palmer was finally revealed after a year of anxious, media-driven anticipation. Cruise also sings "Rockin' Back Inside My Heart" in Industrial Symphony No. 1, another David Lynch project.

Track listing 
 "Rockin' Back Inside My Heart" (edit) – 4:04
 "Falling" (LP version) – 5:18

Charts

References

External links
 

1990 singles
1989 songs
Julee Cruise songs
Music of Twin Peaks
Song recordings produced by Angelo Badalamenti
Song recordings produced by David Lynch
Songs written by Angelo Badalamenti
Songs written by David Lynch
Warner Records singles